My Darling, My Darling (translit. Skapa moya, skapi moy) is a 1986 Bulgarian drama film directed by Eduard Zahariev. It was entered into the 36th Berlin International Film Festival.

Cast
 Mariana Dimitrova as Ana
 Plamen Serakov as Ivan
 Ivan Donev as Vlado
 Raya Bachvarova as Raya
 Andrey Todorov as Andro
 Anton Radichev as Mitko
 Stoyan Stoev as Grigor
 Ana Guncheva as Minka
 Bozhidar Iskrenov as Bozho
 Katya Todorova as Sasedkata
 Blagovest Argirov as Blago
 Svetoslav Argirov as Svet
 Pepa Armankova as Pepa

References

External links

1986 films
1980s Bulgarian-language films
1986 drama films
Films directed by Eduard Sachariev
Bulgarian drama films